SYU may refer to:

 Sahmyook University, South Korea
 Shaoyang University, China
 Shenyang University, China
 Hong Kong Shue Yan University
 Warraber Island Airport, Australia (by IATA code)